Adalberto Lepri (20 October 1929 – 5 October 2014) was an Italian wrestler. He competed in the men's freestyle middleweight at the 1952 Summer Olympics.

References

External links
 

1929 births
2014 deaths
Italian male sport wrestlers
Olympic wrestlers of Italy
Wrestlers at the 1952 Summer Olympics
People from Terni
Sportspeople from the Province of Terni
20th-century Italian people